Yousuf Ijaz Butt (born  October 18, 1989) is a footballer who plays for Ishøj IF and the Pakistan national football team. He has established himself as one of the best goalkeepers in South Asia, where his goalkeeping skills have earned him the nickname ‘The Wall’ from fans in South Asia.

Personal life 
Yousuf is the younger brother of Yaqoob Butt, who has also represented Pakistan at the international level.

Club career
Butt has played over 200 division games in Denmark. He started his professional career at Hellerup IK in 2007 in the Danish 1 division, having previously played for the team's youth academy. Afterwards, he joined 2 BK Skjold for the 2009–10 season 2 division season and played at the club and Skjold Birkerød the following season. Butt was then brought into 2 division side BK Glostrup Albertslund where he eventually became the club captain. In 2014, Butt signed with 1 division club Brønshøj Boldklub and later moved to Svebølle B&I the next season.

1 Division: Hellerup IK, Brønshøj x 2.

2 Division: BK Glostrup Albertslund, BK Skjold, Svebølle, Fredensborg & AB Tårnby.

3 Division: AB Tårnby & Ishøj IF.

International career
He was called to represent the Pakistan national under-23 team in 2011 until making his debut for the national team in November 2012 against Singapore.

He played as the main goalkeeper for Pakistan including the AFC Challenge Cup qualifiers of 2013, the 2013 SAFF Championship, as well as the 2013 Philippine Peace Cup. Butt won the 2018 SAFF Championship Safe Hand, the award for the most saves.

He was also called for the Panjab football team in the 2018 CONIFA World Football Cup, where he made 2 appearances.

References

 https://www.footballpakistan.com/tag/yousuf-butt/
 https://www.footballpakistan.com/2014/08/i-am-still-young-but-i-have-big-ambitions-yousuf-butt/

External links

 
 

1989 births
Living people
Footballers from Copenhagen
Pakistani footballers
Pakistan international footballers
Danish men's footballers
Canadian people of Pakistani descent
Danish people of Pakistani descent
Association football goalkeepers
Hellerup IK players
BK Skjold players
Brønshøj Boldklub players
Fredensborg BI players
Greve Fodbold players
IF Skjold Birkerød players
AB Tårnby players
Ishøj IF players
Herlev IF players